Ch'ŏndong station is a railway station in Ryongjin-dong, Kaech'ŏn municipal city, South P'yŏngan province, North Korea on the Manp'o Line of the Korean State Railway; it is also the starting point of the Taegak Branch to Taegak.

History

The station was opened on 1 December 1918 by the Mitsui Mining Railway, which became the Kaech'ŏn Light Railway in 1927, whose line from Kaech'ŏn to Ch'ŏndong was taken over by the Chosen Government Railway in 1932.

References

Railway stations in North Korea
Buildings and structures in South Pyongan Province
Kaechon
Railway stations opened in 1918
1918 establishments in Korea